"Someday" is a song by American rock band Sugar Ray. First serviced to American radio in June 1999, the song was released on September 7, 1999, as the second single from the band's third album, 14:59 (1999). The song reached number seven on both the US Billboard Hot 100 and the Billboard Modern Rock Tracks chart, as well as number four on Canada's RPM Top Singles chart and number 25 in New Zealand.

Music video

The music video for the song is in black-and-white and is slowed down. The first half features the band playing on a beach and wading in the water. In the second half, the band performs in a bar. Joseph Kahn directed the video.

Track listings
US CD single
 "Someday" (album version)
 "Every Morning" (live acoustic version)
 "Someday" (live acoustic version)

UK CD and cassette single
 "Someday" (album version) – 4:02
 "Someday" (live acoustic version) – 3:42
 "Every Morning" (live acoustic version) – 3:16

German maxi-single
 "Someday" (album version)
 "Fly" (featuring Super Cat)
 "Mean Machine"

Charts

Weekly charts

Year-end charts

Release history

References

1998 songs
1999 singles
Atlantic Records singles
Black-and-white music videos
Lava Records singles
Music videos directed by Joseph Kahn
Song recordings produced by David Kahne
Songs written by David Kahne
Sugar Ray songs